Ethminolia vitiliginea, common name the depressed top shell, is a species of sea snail, a marine gastropod mollusk in the family Trochidae, the top snails.

Description
The size of an adult shell varies between 7 mm and 11 mm. The broadly umbilicate shell is depressed and has a low-conoidal spire. It is thin, scarcely shining, and opaque whitish. The upper surface shows radiating maculations of purplish or olive-brown. The base of the shell is marbled with the same colours. The minute apex is acute. The sutures are well impressed. The approximately 5 whorls are convex, those of the spire subangular in the middle, flattened below the suture, giving the spire a terraced appearance. The body whorl is subcylindrical, obtusely subangular at the periphery, convex beneath. The surface all over is encircled by delicate spiral elevated striae, and around the umbilicus decussated by growth lines. The aperture is subcircular, a trifle modified by the contact of the penultimate whorl. The margins are all thin and simple. The umbilicus is about  the diameter of base, opaque white within, and longitudinally striated.

The tubular whorls, rounded save for a flattened area below the suture, and keel-less except for the carina banding that area, will discriminate this shell from many species. Other marks are the delicate spiral striation, wide umbilicus, and broad radiating maculations of the upper surface.

Distribution
This marine species is endemic to Australia and occurs from the Bass Strait to Western Australia.

References

 Menke, C.T. 1843. Molluscorum Novae Hollandiae Specimen in Libraria Aulica Hahniana. Hannoverae : Libraria Aulica Hahniana pp. 1–46
 Angas, G.F. 1867. A list of species of marine Mollusca found in Port Jackson harbour, New South Wales and on the adjacent coasts, with notes on their habits etc. Proceedings of the Zoological Society of London 1867: 185–233, 912–935
 Tenison-Woods, J.E. 1877. On some new Tasmanian marine shells. Papers and Proceedings of the Royal Society of Tasmania 1876: 131–159
 Pritchard, G.B. & Gatliff, J.H. 1902. Catalogue of the marine shells of Victoria. Part V. Proceedings of the Royal Society of Victoria 14(2): 85–138 
 Cotton, B.C. 1959. South Australian Mollusca. Archaeogastropoda. Handbook of the Flora and Fauna of South Australia. Adelaide : South Australian Government Printer 449 pp.
 Macpherson, J.H. & Gabriel, C.J. 1962. Marine Molluscs of Victoria. Melbourne : Melbourne University Press & National Museum of Victoria 475 pp.
 Wells, F.E. & Bryce, C.W. 1986. Seashells of Western Australia. Perth : Western Australian Museum 207 pp.
 Wilson, B. 1993. Australian Marine Shells. Prosobranch Gastropods. Kallaroo, Western Australia : Odyssey Publishing Vol. 1 408 pp.

External links
 

vitiliginea
Gastropods of Australia
Gastropods described in 1843